Hemaris tityus, the narrow-bordered bee hawk-moth, is a moth of the family Sphingidae which is native to the Palearctic.

Range
It has a wide range, from Ireland across temperate Europe to the Ural Mountains, western Siberia, Novosibirsk and the Altai. It is also known from the Tian Shan eastwards across Mongolia to north-eastern China and southwards to Tibet. There is a separate population found from Turkey to northern Iran.

Biology
It appears in May and June and is a lively day-flier (unlike most other sphingids), generally active from mid-morning to mid-afternoon. It frequents marshy woodland and damp moorland, and has a wide distribution across temperate Europe and Western Asia, but is generally quite scarce. The larvae feed on devil's-bit scabious (Succisa pratensis) and field scabious (Knautia arvensis).

Identification
It is distinguished from H. fuciformis by the narrow band of scaling along the outer wing margin, and the forewing's undivided discal cell. It is one of two similar species of sphingid moth occurring in Britain that closely mimic a bumblebee.

Pictures

References

External links

"69.008 BF1982 Narrow-bordered Bee Hawk-moth Hemaris tityus (Linnaeus, 1758)". UKMoths.
Description in Richard South: The Moths of the British Isles
Lepiforum e.V.

tityus
Moths of Asia
Moths of Europe
Moths described in 1758
Taxa named by Carl Linnaeus